The men's team sabre was one of eight fencing events on the fencing at the 1988 Summer Olympics programme. It was the eighteenth appearance of the event. The competition was held from September 28 to 29, 1988. 53 fencers from 11 nations competed.

Rosters

Results

Round 1

Round 1 Pool A 

Hungary and France each defeated Bulgaria, 9–2 and 9–3 respectively. The winners then faced off, with Hungary winning 9–4.

Round 1 Pool B 

In the first set of matches, Italy beat South Korea 9–2 and West Germany defeated the United States 9–3. The second set saw the winners both win again (securing advancement) and the losers both lose again (resulting in elimination), as Italy prevailed over the United States 9–4 and West Germany won against South Korea 9–1. Finally, Italy took the top spot in the group by beating West Germany 9–5 while South Korea finished last after losing to the United States 9–5.

Round 1 Pool C 

In the first set of matches, the Soviet Union beat Canada 9–1 and Poland defeated China 9–1. The second set saw the winners both win again (securing advancement) and the losers both lose again (resulting in elimination), as the Soviet Union prevailed over China 9–1 and Poland won against Canada 9–3. Finally, the Soviet Union took the top spot in the group by beating Poland 9–7 while China finished last after losing to Canada 9–7.

Elimination rounds

References

Fencing at the 1988 Summer Olympics
Men's events at the 1988 Summer Olympics